On November 20, 1839, a special election was held in  to fill a vacancy caused by the death of William W. Potter (D) on October 28 of that year, before the start of the first session of the 26th Congress.

Election results

McCulloch took his seat on December 2, 1839, at the start of the 1st session of the 26th Congress.

See also
List of special elections to the United States House of Representatives

References

Pennsylvania 1839 14
Pennsylvania 1839 14
1839 14
Pennsylvania 14
United States House of Representatives 14
United States House of Representatives 1839 14